The Sanctuary of San Úrbez or the Hermitage of San Úrbez ( or Ermita de San Úrbez) was a monastery in Nocito, in the municipality of Nueno in the Province of Huesca, Aragon, Spain. It was established in the 12th century on the site of the hermitage of the 9th-century Saint Urbicius. The church housed his relics, which were almost entirely destroyed in the Spanish Civil War.

Christian monasteries established in the 12th century
Urbez, Sanctuary of San
Buildings and structures in the Province of Huesca